Loved may refer to:

 Love, an emotion of strong affection and personal attachment

Music
 Loved (Claire Kuo album) or the title song, 2016
 Loved (Cranes album) or the title song, 1994
 Loved, an album by KEN mode, 2018
 "Loved" (song), by Kim Wilde, 2001

Other uses
 Loved (film), a 1997 American film directed by Erin Dignam
 Loved (video game), a 2010 browser-based platform game

See also
 Beloved (disambiguation)
 Love (disambiguation)